The Terminous Tract is an island in the Sacramento–San Joaquin River Delta. It is part of San Joaquin County, California, and managed by Reclamation District 548. The census-designated place of Terminous, California is on the island.

References

Islands of San Joaquin County, California
Islands of the Sacramento–San Joaquin River Delta
Islands of Northern California